Donald Lee Holmquest (born April 7, 1939) is an American lawyer, physician, electrical engineer, and former NASA astronaut. He was the CEO of the California Regional Health Information Organization (RHIO).

Biography

Early life and education
Holmquest was born on April 7, 1939, in Dallas, Texas. After graduating from Dallas’s Adamson High School, he received a B.S. in electrical engineering from Southern Methodist University with highest honors in 1962. 

After receiving his MD and a PhD in physiology from Baylor College of Medicine in 1967 and 1968, respectively, Holmquist began a residency in internal medicine at Houston Methodist Hospital.

He married Charlotte Ann ( Blaha) in 1967. They have one daughter.

NASA career

Holmquest joined NASA as a scientist-astronaut after completing his internship. After a year of flight training at Williams Air Force Base, Arizona, he earned his Air Force wings, and then worked for  years on Skylab habitability systems and medical experiments. During this time, he logged 750 hours flying time in jet aircraft.

When not assigned to a Skylab prime or backup crew by May 1971, however, Holmquest took a leave of absence from NASA in order to return to Baylor College of Medicine to train in nuclear medicine. He formally resigned from the Astronaut Corps in September 1973.

Post-NASA career
After completing his residency training, Holmquest assumed the role of chief of nuclear medicine at Ben Taub General Hospital, a primary public teaching hospital at Baylor. He was then recruited to California’s Eisenhower Medical Center to establish their Department of Nuclear Medicine. He was then named associate dean of medicine at Texas A&M University as it developed its new College of Medicine.

Holmquest earned a JD degree cum laude from the University of Houston Law Center in 1988. While he continued to practice medicine and serve as adjunct professor of medicine at Baylor College of Medicine, Holmquist also worked as a lawyer, focused on matters related to the health care industry. After working as a senior partner at Wood, Lucksinger & Epstein, he established the firm of Holmquest & Associates. 

Holmquest resides in Menlo Park, California.

Bibliography

Holmquest's career is chronicled in the book NASA's Scientist-Astronauts by David Shayler and Colin Burgess.

References

1939 births
Living people
American astronauts
American people of Swedish descent
Physician astronauts